Walnut Creek is a creek in North Texas. The creek rises to the northeast of Keene in Johnson County, flowing to the Tarrant County near Mansfield. The creek runs to the northeast, forming the border between Dallas and Grand Prairie. The mouth of the creek is west of Duncanville where it meets Mountain Creek.

Walnut Creek Linear Park 
Walnut Creek Linear Park is a public walking trail in Mansfield. The trail follows the course of the creek, and forms a linear connection with various public parks in the city, including Town Park, Katherine Rose Memorial Park and James McKnight Park. A further extension is planned, which will connect the park to the western shores of Joe Pool Lake.

References 

Rivers of Texas
Johnson County, Texas
Tarrant County, Texas